Pavlovka is a rural locality (a selo) in Alexandrovsky Selsoviet, Loktevsky District, Altai Krai, Russia. The population was 141 as of 2013. There are 2 streets.

Geography 
Pavlovka is located on the Aley River, 36 km northeast of Gornyak (the district's administrative centre) by road. Alexandrovka is the nearest rural locality.

References 

Rural localities in Loktevsky District